The 76th parallel south is a circle of latitude that is 76 degrees south of the Earth's equatorial plane in the Antarctic. The parallel passes through the Southern Ocean and Antarctica.

Around the world
Starting at the Prime Meridian and heading eastwards, the parallel 76° south passes through:

{| class="wikitable plainrowheaders"
! scope="col" width="125" | Co-ordinates
! scope="col" | Continent or ocean
! scope="col" | Notes
|-
| 
! scope="row" rowspan="5" | Antarctica
| Queen Maud Land, claimed by 
|-
| 
| Western Australian Antarctic Territory, claimed by 
|-
| 
| Adélie Land, claimed by 
|-
| 
| Eastern Australian Antarctic Territory, claimed by 
|-
| 
| Ross Dependency, claimed by 
|-
| style="background:#b0e0e6;" | 
! scope="row" style="background:#b0e0e6;" | Southern Ocean
| style="background:#b0e0e6;" | Ross Sea, south of the Pacific Ocean
|-
| 
! scope="row" rowspan="6"| Antarctica
| Ross Dependency, claimed by 
|-
| 
| Marie Byrd Land, Unclaimed territory
|-
| 
| Antártica Chilena, claimed by 
|-
| 
|-
| 
|-
| 
|-
| style="background:#b0e0e6;" | 
! scope="row" style="background:#b0e0e6;" | Southern Ocean
| style="background:#b0e0e6;" | Weddell Sea, south of the Atlantic Ocean
|-
| 
! scope="row" rowspan="3" | Antarctica
|-
| 
| British Antarctic Territory, claimed by 
|-
| 
| Queen Maud Land, claimed by 
|}

See also
75th parallel south
77th parallel south

s76